, formerly , is the youngest child and only daughter of Emperor emeritus Akihito and Empress emerita Michiko, and the younger sister of the current Emperor of Japan, Naruhito. She is an imperial Shinto priestess of the Ise Grand Shrine, currently serving as the Supreme Priestess.

Kuroda held the appellation "Nori-no-miya"  (Princess Nori), until her marriage to Yoshiki Kuroda on 15 November 2005. As a result of her marriage, she gave up her imperial title and left the Japanese Imperial Family, as required by the Imperial Household Law.

Education and career

Princess Sayako was born on 18 April 1969 at the Imperial Household Agency Hospital in Tokyo Imperial Palace, Tokyo. Her mother, Empress Emerita Michiko, is a convert to Shinto from Roman Catholicism. She studied at and graduated from the Department of Japanese Language and Literature, Faculty of Letters, Gakushuin University, with the Bachelor of Letters degree in Japanese language and literature in 1992. Later in the year she was accepted as research associate at the Yamashina Institute for Ornithology, where she specialized in the study of kingfishers. In 1998, she was appointed researcher at the same institute.

Apart from her research, Sayako has traveled extensively abroad and within Japan, as a representative of the Imperial family.

Marriage and change in status

On 30 December 2004, the Imperial Household Agency announced the engagement of the 35-year-old Princess Nori to the 39-year-old Yoshiki Kuroda (黒田慶樹 Kuroda Yoshiki). Born in Tokyo on 17 April 1965, he is an urban designer with the Tokyo Metropolitan Government and a longtime friend of Prince Akishino. Upon her marriage, which took place at the Imperial Hotel, Tokyo on 15 November 2005, Princess Nori left the Imperial Family, taking the surname of her husband; he became the first non-aristocratic commoner to marry an Imperial princess. This change in her status is mandated by the Imperial Household Law that requires females of the imperial family who marry to relinquish their title, official membership in the imperial family, and allowance from the state. She became the sixth female member born into the Japanese imperial family to marry a commoner since the passage of the Imperial Household Law in 1947, and the first member of the family to lose royal status since the marriage of Princess Masako of Mikasa, one of Emperor Akihito's cousins, in 1983.

The Emperor and Empress were in attendance at her wedding, as were other members of the imperial family. About 30 people attended the ceremony, and some 120 guests attended the reception. Thousands of well-wishers lined the streets between the royal palace and the city hotel where the half-hour marriage rite took place.

Kuroda resigned from her job as an ornithologist to focus on her family life. While she is no longer entitled to an imperial allowance, she reportedly received a wedding gift worth US$1.2 million from the government. To prepare for her change of lifestyle, Princess Sayako reportedly took driving lessons and practised shopping at the supermarket.

After marriage
In April 2012, Kuroda was appointed as a high priestess of the Ise Grand Shrine to assist her aunt, Atsuko Ikeda, Chief Priestess of the shrine, who was also subjected to the conditions of the Imperial Household Law upon marriage. She was among the guests during a banquet held at the Tokyo Imperial Palace in honour of King Philippe and Queen Mathilde of Belgium in October 2016. Since her marriage, Kuroda has continued to appear on some formal occasions with other members of the Imperial Family. She officially replaced Atsuko Ikeda as the supreme priestess of Ise Shrine on 19 June 2017.

Titles and styles

 18 April 1969 – 15 November 2005: Her Imperial Highness Princess Nori
 15 November 2005 – present: Mrs. Yoshiki Kuroda

Honours

 : Grand Cordon of the Order of the Precious Crown (18 April 1989).

References

External links

 Hello! magazine  — Article on Sayako and Yoshiki Kuroda's wedding
 BBC News — The wedding takes place
 The princess and the people - The Scotsman

1969 births
Living people
People from Tokyo
Japanese princesses
Japanese ornithologists
Gakushuin University alumni

Grand Cordons (Imperial Family) of the Order of the Precious Crown
20th-century Japanese scientists
21st-century Japanese scientists
20th-century women scientists
21st-century women scientists
20th-century Japanese women
21st-century Japanese women
Japanese Shintoists